Archuleta County School District 50-JT is a school district headquartered in Pagosa Springs, Colorado.

The district includes most of Archuleta County. A portion is in Hinsdale County, where it serves Piedra.

History

Linda Reed became the superintendent circa 2013

In 2018 some families dissatisfied with the schools of Dulce Independent Schools in Dulce, New Mexico enrolled their children in Archuleta school district schools. There were 99 such students, with 32, 36, and 31 in elementary, middle, and high school levels, respectively. Reed stated, "people have been doing that for years."

Richard M. Holt became the superintendent in 2022.

Schools
 Pagosa Springs High School
 Pagosa Middle School
 Pagosa Elementary School
 Pagosa Family School
 San Juan Mountain School

Previously the district had separate intermediate school (grades 5-6) and junior high school divisions.

References

External links
 Archuleta County School District 50-JT

Archuleta County, Colorado
Education in Hinsdale County, Colorado
School districts in Colorado